Farrah Laron Franklin (born May 3, 1981) is an American R&B singer and actress. She is also a former member of the girl group Destiny's Child. Along with Michelle Williams, she replaced the group's original members LaTavia Roberson and LeToya Luckett. Franklin spent several months with the group before departing as a member. While her musical contribution to the group was minimal, Franklin's vocals are featured on the group's single "Independent Women Part I" which peaked at number one on the Billboard Hot 100 chart, following her departure.

Early life 
Franklin was born on May 3, 1981 in Des Moines, Iowa, and raised in Fresno, California. She considers Lawrence Bohanon to be her dad, as she never met her biological father, Rodney Allen Heard. Franklin grew up attending church and loving music. She started singing at age two, inspired by Bohanon, who played bass guitar in local bands. She also had a passion for acting and dance. When Franklin was eight, she began performing in plays at the Fresno Memorial Auditorium. She was in the concert choir at Central High School, where she was bullied. At fifteen, Franklin became motivated to leave Fresno to pursue a career in entertainment, after her aunt moved to Los Angeles. She went by the name, Destiny Franklin, before her stint in Destiny's Child. She is of African-American and Italian descent, and the oldest of fifteen children, including a younger sister named Karrie. She is also the cousin of late singer/rapper Natina Reed.

Career

1999–2000: Destiny's Child 
In 1999, while living in Los Angeles, Franklin was hired to be an extra in the music video for Destiny's Child's "Bills, Bills, Bills". It was there that she met with group members Beyoncé Knowles, Kelly Rowland, LeToya Luckett, and LaTavia Roberson. At the time, she was in a fledgling singing group called Jane Doe, which was in the process of disbanding. In January 2000, Mathew Knowles invited Franklin and Michelle Williams to join Destiny's Child, replacing previous group members LeToya and LaTavia without notice. The two were introduced to fans in February 2000, by appearing in the music video for "Say My Name". Franklin toured and performed with the group, and also appeared in the music video for "Jumpin', Jumpin'". She contributed vocals to various Destiny's Child songs, including "Jumpin', Jumpin'" (Remixes), "Upside Down" (Live at VH1 Divas), and "Dot", as well as a few tracks on Survivor, released after her departure, like "Independent Women" and "Dance with Me".

On July 20, 2000, after six months with Destiny's Child, Franklin exited the group. A day later, group member Beyoncé claimed in an interview that Franklin had missed three major promotional dates and expressed a lack of interest in continuing with the group, leaving them with no other choice but to dismiss her. In a later interview, Franklin denied Beyoncé's allegation, stating that she had suffered from dehydration and a stomach virus but was recovering as she traveled with the group to do shows in Seattle and Europe. Farrah contended that after being verbally attacked by management, due to her not showing up because she was ill, she stormed out of the room and quit the group.

2001–present: Solo projects 
After leaving Destiny's Child, Franklin embarked on a solo career. From 2002 to 2003, she was signed to and dropped from Fo' Reel, where she recorded a song titled "Get at Me" with Method Man. She then spent two years signed to Fabolous street label, Street Family Entertainment, before getting dropped in 2005. Prior to joining Destiny's Child, Franklin appeared in the 1999 feature film Trippin' and began an acting career, starring in 2004's The Brewster Project. In 2006, she was cast in an episode on the sitcom, All of Us. She shot an independent thriller film called Eyes of Darkness, which also featured rapper Jayo Felony, and starred in other films like Single Black Female. She's modeled for Russell Simmons' fashion line Def Jam University and has been featured on the covers of Teen People, Ebony, CosmoGirl, Vibe, and Today's Black Woman. Aside from her work as a replacement member in Destiny's Child, she has cameoed in several music videos for artists like Kurupt, Nelly, Mr. Cheeks, and R. L. Huggar.

In January 2007, Franklin made an appearance with other former members of Destiny's Child in the E! special Boulevard of Broken Dreams, which documented their experiences in Destiny's Child and the issues that Franklin faced during the months she was present in the group. Franklin insisted that she was mistreated and ignored by management during meetings when she asked questions about the massive deductions in the group's paychecks. She released a single called "Lollipop" in 2008.

In 2014, Franklin moved from Los Angeles to Atlanta, hoping to restart her career in music. She released a promotional single called "Magic N Makeup" to all streaming markets on September 15, 2015. The music video for the single was released via her official Vevo channel on September 24, 2015. In 2016, Franklin released a song titled "Over"  and uploaded another called "Billion Dollar Fantasy" to SoundCloud in 2017. In 2018, she collaborated with singer Lucky Harmon on the song "Build Me Up", which she cowrote. Franklin also owns a company called One Love Pictures and Entertainment. In June 2020, she released the single "Push Up On Me" featuring rapper Maino.

Personal life 
In June 2016, Franklin was detained by police in DeKalb County, Georgia on charges of public intoxication and marijuana possession. This incident mirrored her 2011 arrest in Culver, City, California and her 2014 arrest in Myrtle Beach, South Carolina. Franklin's biological father, Rodney Allen Heard, died in July 2017. She currently lives in Atlanta, Georgia.

Filmography 
 The Brewster Project (2004) as Maya
 All of Us (TV series, episode: "Robert and Neesee Get Real") (2006)
 Unemployed (2008) as Unemployment Clerk
 Single Black Female (2009) as Karma
 The Preacher's Family (2011) as LaJune Carter
 Eyes of Darkness (2014)
 Tamales and Gumbo (2015)
 Rated ATL (2016)

Discography 
Singles
 2008: "Lolli Pop"
 2015: "Magic N Makeup"
 2016: "Over"
 2017: "Billion Dolla Fantasy"
 2018: "Build Me Up" (with Lucky Harmon)
 2020: "Push Up On Me"

References

External links 

Farrah Franklin Last.fm

1981 births
Living people
20th-century American women singers
21st-century American women singers
African-American women singers
African-American actresses
American film actresses
American women pop singers
Actresses from Des Moines, Iowa
Actresses from Fresno, California
Actresses from Los Angeles
Musicians from Des Moines, Iowa
Musicians from Fresno, California
Singers from Los Angeles
Destiny's Child members
20th-century American singers
21st-century American singers
American people of Italian descent